Wokanda may refer to:

 Camp Wokanda, a former boy scouts camp in Illinois, United States
 A misspelling of Wakanda, a fictional country in the Marvel Comics universe